Jere Karjalainen (born May 23, 1992) is a Finnish professional ice hockey player. He is currently playing with Lukko in the Liiga.

Playing career
Karjalainen made his SM-liiga debut playing with Jokerit during the 2012–13 SM-liiga season.

After eight seasons in the Liiga with Jokerit, HPK and Tappara, Karjalainen left Finland following the 2019–20 season to sign a one-year contract with Russian club, HC Sochi of the KHL, on 2 May 2020.

Karjalainen left HC Sochi as a free agent and signed a one-year contract with fellow KHL club, Dinamo Riga, on 3 May 2021.

After two seasons abroad, Karjalainen returned to Finland in signing a one-year contract with Lukko on 14 August 2022.

Career statistics

International

References

External links

1992 births
Living people
Dinamo Riga players
Finnish ice hockey right wingers
HPK players
Jokerit players
Kiekko-Vantaa players
Lukko players
HC Sochi players
Ice hockey people from Helsinki
Tappara players